Pirates of the Revolution is the third installment of the constructible strategy game Pirates of the Spanish Main by WizKids. As its name suggests, it takes place during the Revolutionary War.

Set Details
Pirates of the Revolution contains a total of 144 new ships, crew, forts, and treasure, printed on a deep blue background with the star expansion symbol printed in the corner.

The Revolution set expands the role of the American fleet, previously introduced as a Super Rare ship in Crimson Coast, with 22 new ships, plus a host of unique crew including John Paul Jones. The expansion includes reinforcements for the original factions from the Spanish Main and Crimson Coast sets. It also contains 4 Super Rare pieces: a Pirate chainshot specialist, Wesley (who shares the name & image of the character from the film The Princess Bride), and 2 ships - Star of Siam, and Asp.

In the 2005 Christmas season, WizKids released 6 collectible tins containing Revolution packs in an Unlimited Edition. The game pieces are the same, but the collector numbers are preceded by the letters "UL", and 4 new ships were added; the Hangman's Noose (pirate UL145), the Red Curse (pirate UL146), the Concord (American UL147), and the Franklin (American UL148). These tins were mostly sold in mass-market retail outlets like Toys "R" Us and Target. By early 2006 the unlimited packs were showing up in regular hobby stores as well.

Notable Ships
Constitution - American, 5-mast, 22 points. Ability:  Two hits from the same shoot action are required to eliminate one of this ship's masts. A good battleship with an excellent ability, it is one of the better ships in the game.
HMS Dreadnought - British, 5-mast, 26 points. Aside from the Baochuan and the Guichuan, this is the most expensive ship in the game.  It is a five mast ship with cannons that cannot be eliminated unless no masts remain, thus making it a threat until it sinks.
La Santa Isabel - Spanish, 4-mast, 13 points. This ship is able to add 2 gold points to any one treasure when dropped off at the home island.
Black Swan - Pirate, 5-mast, 13 points.  This ship can carry any crew and be able to use their abilities which can be useful when trying to come up with a strategy. Definitely a battle ship because of less cargo capacity than number of masts.
Neptune's Hoard - Pirate, 4-mast, 12 points.  This versatile ship can serve as either a moderately armed gunship or a heavily armed treasure runner with her 5 cargo.  Her ability to switch treasure is quite handy.  A popular combination is to put Captain Blackheart in command with a helmsman and several oarsmen or explorers.  This ship is a favorite in treasure running fleets but can still pack a punch if the enemy chooses to engage.
Banshee's Cry - Pirate, 1-mast, 3 points.  Popular due mostly to her 3 points, the Banshee's Cry can serve quite well as a treasure runner.  Paired with Jonah, she can take on a sizable crew with her 4 cargo.  If Don Pedro Gilbert takes command with an oarsman and explorer, the Banshee's Cry can be sent out very efficiently.
Le Superbe - French, 5-mast, 16 points.  This ship can shoot over other ships which can be used in order to create a tactical advantage for the player of this ship. The cannons are reasonably good so this ship would make a good battleship.

Notable Crew
Pirate - Don Pedro Gilbert (sacrifice a crew for extra action; treasure switcher)
English - Robinson (0pts, crew cost 0 on this ship)
French - Madame La Fontaine (0LR: reroll 1 die per turn)
American - John Paul Jones (this ship's crew can't be eliminated; roll 1d6 and on 5 or 6, double action)

Revolution